The 37 mm gun M1 was an anti-aircraft autocannon developed in the United States. It was used by the US Army in World War II.

The gun was produced in a towed variant, or mounted along with two M2 machine guns on the M2/M3 half-track, resulting in the T28/T28E1/M15/M15A1 series of multiple gun motor carriages.

In early World War II, each Army Anti-Aircraft Artillery (AAA) Auto-Weapons battalion was authorized a total of thirty-two 37 mm guns in its four firing batteries, plus other weapons.

During World War II the 37 mm gun M1 was deployed in coast defense anti-motor torpedo boat batteries (AMTB) alongside 90 mm guns, usually four 90 mm and two 37 mm guns per battery. Some AMTB batteries consisted of four 37 mm guns, but most sources have little information on these batteries. In the later part of the war the 37 mm gun was typically replaced by the 40 mm Bofors gun M1.

Components
Two gun units were coupled to the M5 gun director using the M1 remote control system. The system was powered by the M5 generating unit. If the remote system was inoperative the M5 sighting system was used.

Ammunition
The M1 utilized fixed ammunition. Projectiles were fitted with a 37×223mmSR cartridge case.

Variants
The 37 mm M9 autocannon was a derivative of the M1A2 anti-aircraft gun. It was used on PT boats around 1944 in the Pacific theater during World War II, replacing the M4 autocannon.

Comparison of anti-aircraft guns

See also
 List of U.S. Army weapons by supply catalog designation
 Kerrison Predictor

Notes

References
Hogg, Ian. Twentieth-Century Artillery. New York: Barnes & Noble Books, 2000.  Pg.106
 
 
 
 TM 9-2300 standard artillery and fire control material. dated 1944
 TM 9-235
 TM 9-1235
 SNL A-29

External links

 "US Army Gets A New Antiaircraft Gun", September 1940, Popular Science
 FM 4-112 Coast Artillery Field Manual: Antiaircraft Artillery gunnery, Fire Control, Position Finding, and Horizontal Fire, Antiaircraft Automatic Weapons (Case I Firing)
 History of the Americanization of the Bofors 40mm Automatic Antiaircraft Gun—some references to the 37mm
 37mm Antiaircraft Automatic Gun—Antiaircraft.org

37 mm artillery
Anti-aircraft guns of the United States
World War II anti-aircraft guns
World War II weapons of the United States
Military equipment introduced in the 1930s